Daba is a town under the administration of Yangdong District, Yangjiang, Guangdong, China. , it administers Daba Residential Neighborhood and the following 21 villages:
Daba Village
Jishui Village
Gucheng Village
Liang'ai Village
Longxin Village
Baimeng Village
Niuling Village
Xindong Village
Dapi Village
Hedong Village
Maotang Village
Leigang Village
Dagangtang Village
Zhouheng Village
Jinggang Village
Shalang Village
Zhuhuan Village
Taidong Village
Luotian Village
Zoumaping Village
Changping Village

References 

Towns in Guangdong
Yangjiang